Runet, a portmanteau of ru (code for both the Russian language and Russia's top-level domain) and net/network, is the Russian-language community on the Internet and websites. The term Runet was coined in Israel in the spring of 1997 by an Israeli resident and Russian-language speaker from Baku, Azerbaijan, blogger Raffi Aslanbekov also known in Russia as Great Uncle, an author of the online column Great Uncle's Thoughts. Runet was popularized by early Internet users and was included in several dictionaries, including the spelling dictionary of the Russian Academy of Sciences, edited by V. V. Lopatin in 2001.

The Internet in Russian (also Russian Internet) is a part of the Internet that uses the Russian language. Geographically, it reaches all continents, including Antarctica (Russian scientists on Bellingshausen Station), but mostly it is based in Russia.

For ordinary users, the term Runet means that the content of websites is available for Russian users without foreign language skills, or that online shops have an office in Russia (for example, Russian search engines, e-mail services, anti-viruses, dictionaries, Russian-language clones of Facebook, Amazon, YouTube, eBay, PayPal, Foursquare, etc. for usage in all post-Soviet states), so the term is related to practical usage for end users. Being on the Runet gives a company some advantage, as many local IT-companies are more successful than foreign services on the Russian market. The term can describe the situation of the 1990s to the early 2000s; foreign companies didn't want to operate in the Russian market and localize their products, so Russia-based start-ups were more attractive to Russian speaking users. Nowadays, some Russian users are not interested in usage of such services as Facebook or Google Maps because local services have more Russia-specific features and local community (VK.com, Yandex services, etc.), though many international websites have very high quality Russian localization and Google search has had full support of Russian morphology for about 10 years. These situations are more or less applicable to most of post-Soviet states and these states are using the Internet in Russian language and forming a common lingua franca community like English on the Internet.

Many officials of the Russian government actively use this term as a synonym for Internet in the territory of Russia, i.e. for Internet infrastructure, which is subject to Russian law (including Russian censorship laws, copyright, corporate, advertisement laws, etc.), but the Russian online community doesn't support this use of the term as millions of users use the Russian language on the Internet while living outside Russia; Russian is spoken in large parts of eastern Europe that do not fall under Russian territory. Some Russian officials automatically believe that the Russian Wikipedia is based in Russia as a business entity and try to control the content of the website or establish a Russia-based clone of Wikipedia.

Domains
According to reports conducted by Yandex, Russian is the primary language of 91% of Russian websites (in Yandex's list). In the autumn of 2009, Runet contained about 15 million sites (estimated to be about 6.5% of the entire Internet).

Domains with a high proportion of the Russian language include .su, .ru, .рф, .ua, .by, .kz.

Russian is used on 89.8% of .ru sites and on 88.7% of the former Soviet Union domain, .su. Russian is the most used language of websites of several countries that were part of the former Soviet Union: 79.0% in Ukraine, 86.9% in Belarus, 84.0% in Kazakhstan, 79.6% in Uzbekistan, 75.9% in Kyrgyzstan, and 81.8% in Tajikistan.

Statistics
As of 2013, the 59.7 million Russian-speaking Internet users, represented 3% of global Internet users. In April 2012, Russia was ranked 9th in the world for number of users and 4th (with 4.8%) for number of Russian-language content.

In September 2011, Russia surpassed Germany as the biggest Internet market in Europe, with 50.8 million users.

In March 2013, it was announced that Russian is the second most used language on the web.

Historical overview

Historically the term Runet has been described in several ways.

 In 2009, a Yandex report stated that Runet can pertain to sites written in Russian, Ukrainian, Belarusian and Kazakh languages, as well as sites in any language published in the 12 national domains of the original CIS nations: .am, .az, .by, .ge, .kg, .kz, .md, .ru, .su, .tj, .ua or .uz.
 Russian-language Internet. According to the definition in Yandex slovari dictionary published in 2001, "Runet is the Russian Internet. The borders of Internet are usually not based on the "geographical borders", but rather on "languages", and therefore the term Runet is usually considered to be not only websites in .ru domain, but also all Russian-language and/or Russian-oriented websites". "Economic dictionary" of 2009 says "Runet is Russian-language part of the Internet". This is a common meaning of Runet. Practically, this definition makes it the Russian-language online community of post-Soviet states and their diasporas.
 .ru domain. Runet is the part of Internet, whose websites are in the top-level .ru domain. This definition would exclude Russian (language) or Russian (country) sites intentionally using other domains. Highly popular alternative domains include ".net" for humorous impact or strength of statement (as this means "no" in Russian), popular havens for illegal activities like ".me" (piracy) or ".cz" (to avoid prosecution for facilitation of prostitution), or ".com" for international expansion – the latter being home to Russia's #2 site by Alexa rank, domestic-owned and based international social network Vk.com.
 Internet in the Russian Federation. According to the definitions found in Finansovy Slovar' and some early-version Yandex slovari dictionaries (disputed by revisions), "Runet is the Russian part of Internet". Also, Russian officials strongly suggest that Runet is the Internet in Russia.

Research
Harvard University's Berkman Center conducts regular researches of the Russian-language Web, identified by Cyrillic encoding, and, in particular, has papers named "Mapping RuNet Politics and Mobilization" and "RuNet Echo". The prominent Public Opinion Foundation (FOM) regular Internet measurements are titled Runet.fom.ru. There are Russian internet-reviewing newspapers called TheRunet, Runetologia and others.

See also 
 Russophone
 Russian Internet slang
 Russian-language computing
 Russian-language websites
 English on the Internet
 Languages used on the Internet

References

External links

History of the Internet in Russia 
History of the Internet in Russian language 
10-years-celebration of Runet 

Russian Internet slang
Russian language
Internet in Russia
Internet in Ukraine
Russian-language computing
Natural language and computing
Internet in Belarus
Internet in Kazakhstan
Internet in Kyrgyzstan